Big Grove can refer to:
Big Grove Township, Kendall County, Illinois
Big Grove Township, Benton County, Iowa